The 1911 New York Giants season was the franchise's 29th season. The Giants won their first of three consecutive National League pennants. They were defeated by the Philadelphia Athletics in the World Series. The team set and still holds the Major League Baseball single-season record for stolen bases during the modern era (since 1901), with 347.

Led by manager John McGraw, the Giants won the National League pennant by  games. On the offensive side, they finished second in runs scored. On the defensive side, they allowed the fewest. Hall of Famer Christy Mathewson led the league in earned run average, and Rube Marquard had the most strikeouts.  The Giants hit 103 triples, the most in franchise history.

Taken together with the 1912 and 1913 pennant winners, this team is considered one of the greatest of all-time.

Regular season

Season standings

Record vs. opponents

Roster

Charlie "Victory" Faust 
One of the Giants' drawing cards came in the form of unknown pitcher Charlie Faust, whose story was retold by Fred Snodgrass in The Glory of Their Times. Faust was considered something of a "good-luck charm" by manager McGraw, and was used sparingly. In 1911, Faust appeared in just two games for the team, which was the entirety of his major league playing career. As a pitcher, he pitched two innings, giving up one run. As a batter, he tallied one hit by pitch, two stolen bases, and one run scored, in zero at bats.

Player stats

Batting

Starters by position 
Note: Pos = Position; G = Games played; AB = At bats; H = Hits; Avg. = Batting average; HR = Home runs; RBI = Runs batted in

Other batters 
Note: G = Games played; AB = At bats; H = Hits; Avg. = Batting average; HR = Home runs; RBI = Runs batted in

Pitching

Starting pitchers 
Note: G = Games pitched; IP = Innings pitched; W = Wins; L = Losses; ERA = Earned run average; SO = Strikeouts

Other pitchers 

Note: G = Games pitched; IP = Innings pitched; W = Wins; L = Losses; ERA = Earned run average; SO = Strikeouts

Relief pitchers 
Note: G = Games pitched; W = Wins; L = Losses; SV = Saves; ERA = Earned run average; SO = Strikeouts

1911 World Series

Game 1 
October 14, 1911, at the Polo Grounds in New York City

Game 2 
October 16, 1911, at Shibe Park in Philadelphia

Game 3 
October 17, 1911, at the Polo Grounds in New York City

Game 4 
October 24, 1911, at Shibe Park in Philadelphia

Game 5 
October 25, 1911, at the Polo Grounds in New York City

Game 6 
October 26, 1911, at Shibe Park in Philadelphia

References

External links

1911 New York Giants season at Baseball Reference

New York Giants (NL)
San Francisco Giants seasons
New York Giants season
National League champion seasons
New York G
1910s in Manhattan
Washington Heights, Manhattan